is a Japanese television drama series that premiered on NTV on 16 January 2016. It is based on the mystery novel by Manabu Kaminaga, who is known for Psychic Detective Yakumo. Kazuya Kamenashi, a member of the musical group KAT-TUN, played the lead role. Suzu Hirose and Hiroki Narimiya appeared in supporting roles. The first episode received a viewership rating of 14.3%.

Cast
Kazuya Kamenashi as Yamaneko, a thief and a private detective
Hiroki Narimiya as Hideo Katsumura, a copywriter
Suzu Hirose as Mao Takasugi
Nanao as Sakura Kirishima, a detective
Hiroyuki Ikeuchi as Katsuaki Inui, a detective
Kuranosuke Sasaki as Shūgo Sekimoto, a detective chief inspector
Shizuka Nakamura as a mysterious woman

References

External links
 

Japanese drama television series
2016 Japanese television series debuts
2016 Japanese television series endings
Nippon TV dramas
Television shows based on Japanese novels